Bintou Keita (born 1958) is a United Nations diplomat from Guinea. She is an expert in conflict resolution. Since January 2021, she has been the Special Representative of the Secretary-General in the Democratic Republic of the Congo.

Early life and education
Keita was born in Guinea in 1958. Her education included a degree in Social Economy from the University of Paris. She went to the Paris Dauphine University to obtain her masters degree in business administration and management.

Career 
She began working for the United Nations in 1989.

In 2018 she left her job as Deputy Joint Special Envoy for the (African Union-United Nations Hybrid Operation in Darfur (UNAMID). Her old role was taken by Anita Kiki Gbeho.

In 2019, Keita became the Assistant Secretary-General for Africa. She gave an interview where she spoke about the advantages of increasing the number of women in the military. Her father was in the military and he had encouraged her to join. Now she observing the military engaged in Africa and she noted that there were situations where women or a mixed team could perform tasks that would nearly defeat a force made up only of men. At present women only make up 5% of uniformed personnel.

In January 2021, she was appointed to lead the United Nations Organization Stabilization Mission in the Democratic Republic of the Congo MONUSCO and to be the UN Secretary General's Special Representative in the Democratic Republic of the Congo. She succeeded the Algerian UN official Leila Zerrougui. In April she issued a statement to the press. While accepting that people had the right to criticise MONUSCO she felt that some of the points were unfair. She wrote that "relationship between the United Nations and the Democratic Republic of the Congo is of an intensity and complexity that I have rarely seen elsewhere."

References

1958 births
Living people
Guinean diplomats
Guinean people
Guinean women diplomats
Paris Dauphine University alumni
Special Representatives of the Secretary-General of the United Nations
United Nations officials
University of Paris alumni